J. Christian Bollwage Finance Academy is a four-year comprehensive public high school located in Elizabeth, in Union County, New Jersey, United States, operating as part of Elizabeth Public Schools. The academy accepts students in ninth through twelfth grades in Elizabeth who have passed the requirements for enrollment. The academy is operated by the Elizabeth Board of Education.

As of the 2021–22 school year, the school had an enrollment of 334 students and 26.5 classroom teachers (on an FTE basis), for a student–teacher ratio of 12.6:1. There were 195 students (58.4% of enrollment) eligible for free lunch and 34 (10.2% of students) eligible for reduced-cost lunch.

History
Established in 2011 as the Academy of Finance, the J. Christian Bollwage Finance Academy was named for the longtime mayor of Elizabeth, who also has a parking garage and housing complex named in his honor.

Administration
The school's principal is Dr. Megan Marx. Her core administrative team includes the vice principal.

References

External links
 School website
 

2011 establishments in New Jersey
Education in Elizabeth, New Jersey
Educational institutions established in 2011
Public high schools in Union County, New Jersey